Knowlton Mansion, also known as the Rhawn Residence, is a historic mansion in the Fox Chase neighborhood of Philadelphia, Pennsylvania, United States.

The three-story mansion was designed in the Gothic Revival style by renowned 19th century architect Frank Furness as a residence for William Rhawn, a successful Philadelphia banker.  The house was completed in 1881 and was named after John Knowles, Rhawn's wife's great-grandfather. It later served as the residence for Robert MacKay Green II, who was the son of Robert MacKay Green I who invented ice cream soda in 1874.

The mansion was listed on the National Register of Historic Places in 1974. Today the mansion serves as the home to Conroy Catering. The first fundraiser held at Knowlton by Conroy Catering was for former State Representative Chris Wogan in December 1997 .

See also

 King, Moses. Philadelphia and Notable Philadelphians. New York: Blanchard Press, Isaac H. Blanchard Co., 1901, p. 85.

References

External links
Knowlton Mansion history
Listing and photographs at Philadelphia Architects and Buildings

Frank Furness buildings
Gothic Revival architecture in Pennsylvania
Houses on the National Register of Historic Places in Philadelphia
Houses completed in 1881
Houses in Philadelphia
Fox Chase, Philadelphia
1881 establishments in Pennsylvania